Bill Inglot is an American music engineer and producer, best known for remastering older recordings to high quality digital standards.

Inglot worked for Rhino Entertainment and other Warner Music Group labels from 1982 to 2007. He was largely responsible for reintroducing historically popular pop music to modern audiences. Recordings he remastered include those of Ray Charles, The Bee Gees, Ramones, Aretha Franklin, The Four Seasons, Otis Redding, The Monkees, and Booker T. & the MGs.

References

Record producers from California
American audio engineers
Living people
California State University, Northridge alumni
Rhino Entertainment
Engineers from California
Year of birth missing (living people)